The Arnedo Solar Plant is a solar photovoltaic power plant located in Arnedo, La Rioja, Spain.  The power system installations are supplied and the solar plant is operated by T-Solar.  The plant was built by Isolux Corsán in 2008. It cost €181 million.

The Arnedo Solar Plant has a capacity of 34 MW which is provided by 172,000 modules 200 W each. It produces approximately  annually, equivalent to the power consumption of 11,451 households.

See also 

 List of power stations in Spain
 List of photovoltaic power stations

References 

Photovoltaic power stations in Spain